Antonin Bobichon (born 14 September 1995) is a French professional footballer who plays as a right winger for  club Laval.

Club career
Bobichon is a youth exponent from Nîmes Olympique. He made his Ligue 2 debut on 17 October 2014 against Tours in a 2–1 away win, playing the entire game.

On 7 January 2022, he joined Nancy on loan until the end of the season.

On 6 January 2023, Bobichon signed a year-and-a-half-long contract with Ligue 2 club Laval.

References

1995 births
People from Bagnols-sur-Cèze
Sportspeople from Gard
Footballers from Occitania (administrative region)
Living people
Association football wingers
French footballers
Ligue 1 players
Ligue 2 players
Championnat National players
Championnat National 2 players
Championnat National 3 players
Nîmes Olympique players
CA Bastia players
Angers SCO players
AS Nancy Lorraine players
Stade Lavallois players